Jalilvand may refer to:
 Jalilvand, Eslamabad-e Gharb
 Jalilvand, Harsin